Jin Ha is a South Korean-born American actor known for his roles in the TV series Devs, Love Life, and Pachinko in addition to the musical Hamilton.

Early life and education 
Ha was born in Seoul, South Korea, before moving to the United States at the age of eight.
After attending Choate Rosemary Hall, a Connecticut college-preparatory school, he enrolled at Columbia University. Though he applied to the school's theater department, Ha decided to study East Asian languages and cultures, graduating in 2013. He later obtained a graduate degree in acting from New York University Tisch School of the Arts.

Career 
After graduate school, Ha got his first acting job in 2016 in Troilus and Cressida with Shakespeare in the Park. He went on to join the original company of the Chicago production of Hamilton as ensemble member Phillip Schuyler/James Reynolds and as understudy of Alexander Hamilton, Aaron Burr, John Laurens/Phillip Hamilton, and King George III; Ha returned to the Chicago production in 2018 to perform as Aaron Burr, and reprised the role for the Broadway production's reopening in 2021 following its hiatus during the COVID-19 pandemic.
In 2017, Ha originated the role of Chinese opera singer Song Liling opposite Clive Owen in the Broadway revival of David Henry Hwang's M. Butterfly, directed by Julie Taymor. In 2018, he played Annas in NBC's production of Jesus Christ Superstar Live in Concert, which also featured John Legend and Sara Bareilles.

In 2020, Ha starred in the FX show Devs and had a recurring role in the HBO Max show Love Life opposite Anna Kendrick. Writing in The Hollywood Reporter, reviewer Daniel Fienberg gave Love Life a lukewarm review but praised Ha's performance, saying Ha was "making a strong case that he's ready for something much better than this".

In 2022, Ha starred as Solomon Baek in Pachinko, adapted from the novel of the same name by Min Jin Lee.

Credits

Film/Television

Theater

References

External links

American male actors of Korean descent
South Korean emigrants to the United States
American male musical theatre actors
American male television actors
Tisch School of the Arts alumni
Columbia College (New York) alumni
Choate Rosemary Hall alumni
Year of birth missing (living people)
Living people